The 2020 Czech Mixed Doubles Curling Championship was held in Prague from February 1 to 4, 2020.

Six teams took part in the championship.

The winners of the championship were team "Zbraslav H" (Zuzana Paulová / Tomáš Paul), who beat team "Savona 5" (Karolína Frederiksen / Radek Boháč) in the final. The bronze medal was won by team "Savona M" (Eva Miklíková / Dalibor Miklík).

The championship team will represent the Czech Republic at the 2020 World Mixed Doubles Curling Championship.

Teams

Round Robin

Playoffs

Semifinal
February 2, 17:30 UTC+1

Final
February 3, 14:00 UTC+1

Final standings

References

See also
2020 Czech Men's Curling Championship
2020 Czech Women's Curling Championship

Czech Mixed Doubles Curling Championship
Czech Mixed Doubles Curling Championship
Curling Mixed Doubles Championship
Czech Mixed Doubles Curling Championship
Sports competitions in Prague